"Best Song Ever" is a 2013 single by One Direction.

Best Song Ever may also refer to:
"Best Song Ever", a 2010 single by Katie Armiger from her album Confessions of a Nice Girl
"Give Me Your Hand (Best Song Ever)", a song by The Ready Set
"The Best Song Ever Written", a song by Captain Howdy